The Han dynasty (206 BCE – 220 CE) of early imperial China, divided between the eras of Western Han (206 BCE – 9 CE, when the capital was at Chang'an), the Xin dynasty of Wang Mang (r. 9–23 CE), and Eastern Han (25–220 CE, when the capital was at Luoyang, and after 196 CE at Xuchang), witnessed some of the most significant advancements in premodern Chinese science and technology.

There were great innovations in metallurgy. In addition to Zhou-era China's (c. 1046 – 256 BCE) previous inventions of the blast furnace and cupola furnace to make pig iron and cast iron, respectively, the Han period saw the development of steel and wrought iron by use of the finery forge and puddling process. With the drilling of deep boreholes into the earth, the Chinese used not only derricks to lift brine up to the surface to be boiled into salt, but also set up bamboo-crafted pipeline transport systems which brought natural gas as fuel to the furnaces. Smelting techniques were enhanced with inventions such as the waterwheel-powered bellows; the resulting widespread distribution of iron tools facilitated the growth of agriculture. For tilling the soil and planting straight rows of crops, the improved heavy-moldboard plough with three iron plowshares and sturdy multiple-tube iron seed drill were invented in the Han, which greatly enhanced production yields and thus sustained population growth. The method of supplying irrigation ditches with water was improved with the invention of the mechanical chain pump powered by the rotation of a waterwheel or draft animals, which could transport irrigation water up elevated terrains. The waterwheel was also used for operating trip hammers in pounding grain and in rotating the metal rings of the mechanical-driven astronomical armillary sphere representing the celestial sphere around the Earth.

The quality of life was improved with many Han inventions. The Han Chinese had hempen-bound bamboo scrolls to write on, yet by the 2nd century CE had invented the papermaking process which created a writing medium that was both cheap and easy to produce. The invention of the wheelbarrow aided in the hauling of heavy loads. The maritime junk ship and stern-mounted steering rudder enabled the Chinese to venture out of calmer waters of interior lakes and rivers and into the open sea. The invention of the grid reference for maps and raised-relief map allowed for better navigation of their terrain. In medicine, they used new herbal remedies to cure illnesses, calisthenics to keep physically fit, and regulated diets to avoid diseases. Authorities in the capital were warned ahead of time of the direction of sudden earthquakes with the invention of the seismometer that was tripped by a vibration-sensitive pendulum device. To mark the passing of the seasons and special occasions, the Han Chinese used two variations of the lunisolar calendar, which were established due to efforts in astronomy and mathematics. Han-era Chinese advancements in mathematics include the discovery of square roots, cube roots, the Pythagorean theorem, Gaussian elimination, the Horner scheme, improved calculations of pi, and negative numbers. Hundreds of new roads and canals were built to facilitate transport, commerce, tax collection, communication, and movement of military troops. The Han-era Chinese also employed several types of bridges to cross waterways and deep gorges, such as beam bridges, arch bridges, simple suspension bridges, and pontoon bridges. Han ruins of defensive city walls made of brick or rammed earth still stand today.

Modern perspectives

Jin Guantao, a professor of the Institute of Chinese Studies at the Chinese University of Hong Kong, Fan Hongye, a research fellow with the Chinese Academy of Sciences' Institute of Science Policy and Managerial Science, and Liu Qingfeng, a professor of the Institute of Chinese Culture at the Chinese University of Hong Kong, assert that the latter part of the Han dynasty was a unique period in the history of premodern Chinese science and technology. They compare it to the incredible pace of scientific and technological growth during the Song dynasty (960–1279). However, they also argue that without the influence of proto-scientific precepts in the ancient philosophy of Mohism, Chinese science continued to lack a definitive structure:

From the middle and late Eastern Han to the early Wei and Jin dynasties, the net growth of ancient Chinese science and technology experienced a peak (second only to that of the Northern Song dynasty) ...Han studies of the Confucian classics, which for a long time had hindered the socialization of science, were declining. If Mohism, rich in scientific thought, had rapidly grown and strengthened, the situation might have been very favorable to the development of a scientific structure. However, this did not happen because the seeds of the primitive structure of science were never formed. During the late Eastern Han, disastrous upheavals again occurred in the process of social transformation, leading to the greatest social disorder in Chinese history. One can imagine the effect of this calamity on science.

Joseph Needham (1900–1995), a late Professor from the University of Cambridge and author of the groundbreaking Science and Civilisation in China series, stated that the "Han time (especially the Later Han) was one of the relatively important periods as regards the history of science in China." He noted the advancements during Han of astronomy and calendrical sciences, the "beginnings of systematic botany and zoology", as well as the philosophical skepticism and rationalist thought embodied in Han works such as the Lunheng by the philosopher Wang Chong (27–100 CE).

Writing materials

The most common writing mediums found in archaeological digs from ancient sites predating the Han period are shells and bones as well as bronzewares. In the beginning of the Han period, the chief writing mediums were bamboo and clay tablets, silk cloth, strips of soft wood, and rolled scrolls made of strips of bamboo sewn together with hempen string passed through drilled holes (册) and secured with clay stamps. The written characters on these narrow flat strips of bamboo were arranged into vertical columns.

While maps drawn in ink on flat silk cloths have been found in the tomb of the Marquess of Dai (interred in 168 BCE at Mawangdui, Hunan province), the earliest known paper map found in China, dated 179–141 BCE and located at Fangmatan (near Tianshui, Gansu province), is incidentally the oldest known piece of paper. Yet Chinese hempen paper of the Western Han and early Eastern Han eras was of a coarse quality and used primarily as wrapping paper. The papermaking process was not formally introduced until the Eastern Han court eunuch Cai Lun (50–121 CE) created a process in 105 where mulberry tree bark, hemp, old linens, and fish nets were boiled together to make a pulp that was pounded, stirred in water, and then dunked with a wooden sieve containing a reed mat that was shaken, dried, and bleached into sheets of paper. The oldest known piece of paper with writing on it comes from the ruins of a Chinese watchtower at Tsakhortei, Alxa League, Inner Mongolia, dated precisely to 110 CE when the Han garrison abandoned the area following a nomadic Xiongnu attack. By the 3rd century, paper became one of China's chief writing mediums.

Ceramics

The Han ceramics industry was upheld by private businesses as well as local government agencies. Ceramics were used in domestic wares and utensils as well as construction materials for roof tiles and bricks.

Han dynasty grey pottery—its color derived from the clay that was used—was superior to earlier Chinese grey pottery due to the Han people's use of larger kiln chambers, longer firing tunnels, and improved chimney designs. Kilns of the Han dynasty making grey pottery were able to reach firing temperatures above . However, hard southern Chinese pottery made from a dense adhesive clay native only in the south (i.e. Guangdong, Guangxi, Hunan, Jiangxi, Fujian, Zhejiang, and southern Jiangsu) was fired at even higher temperatures than grey pottery during the Han.

Wang Zhongshu states that the light-green stoneware known as celadon was thought to exist only since the Three Kingdoms period (220–265 CE) onwards, but argues that ceramic shards found at Eastern Han (25–220 CE) sites of Zhejiang province can be classified as celadon.

Metallurgy

Furnaces and smelting techniques

A blast furnace converts raw iron oxide into iron, which can be remelted in a cupola furnace to produce cast iron. The earliest specimens of cast iron found in China date to the 5th century BCE during the late Spring and Autumn period, yet the oldest discovered blast furnaces date to the 3rd century BCE and the majority date to the period after Emperor Wu of Han (r. 141–87 BCE) established a government monopoly over the iron industry in 117 BCE (most of the discovered iron works sites built before this date were merely foundries which recast iron that had been smelted elsewhere). Iron ore smelted in blast furnaces during the Han was rarely if ever cast directly into permanent molds; instead, the pig iron scraps were remelted in the cupola furnace to make cast iron. Cupola furnaces utilized a cold blast traveling through tuyere pipes from the bottom and over the top where the charge of charcoal and pig iron was introduced. The air traveling through the tuyere pipes thus became a hot blast once it reached the bottom of the furnace.

Although Chinese civilization lacked the bloomery, the Han Chinese were able to make wrought iron when they injected too much oxygen into the cupola furnace, causing decarburization. The Han-era Chinese were also able to convert cast iron and pig iron into wrought iron and steel by using the finery forge and puddling process, the earliest specimens of such dating to the 2nd century BCE and found at Tieshengguo near Mount Song of Henan province. The semisubterranean walls of these furnaces were lined with refractory bricks and had bottoms made of refractory clay. Besides charcoal made of wood, Wang Zhongshu states that another furnace fuel used during the Han were "coal cakes", a mixture of coal powder, clay, and quartz.

Use of steel, iron, and bronze

Donald B. Wagner writes that most domestic iron tools and implements produced during the Han were made of cheaper and more brittle cast iron, whereas the military preferred to use wrought iron and steel weaponry due to their more durable qualities. The ancient dagger-axe (ge) made of bronze was still used by Han soldiers, although it was gradually phased out by iron spears and iron ji halberds. Even arrowheads, which were traditionally made of bronze, gradually only had a bronze tip and iron shaft, until the end of the Han when the entire arrowhead was made solely of iron. Farmers, carpenters, bamboo craftsmen, stonemasons, and rammed earth builders had at their disposal iron tools such as the plowshare, pickaxe, spade, shovel, hoe, sickle, axe, adze, hammer, chisel, knife, saw, scratch awl, and nails. Common iron commodities found in Han dynasty homes included tripods, stoves, cooking pots, belt buckles, tweezers, fire tongs, scissors, kitchen knives, fish hooks, and needles. Mirrors and oil lamps were often made of either bronze or iron. Coin money minted during the Han was made of either copper or copper and tin smelted together to make the bronze alloy.

Agriculture

Tools and methods

Modern archaeologists have unearthed Han iron farming tools throughout China, from Inner Mongolia in the north to Yunnan in the south. The spade, shovel, pick, and plow were used for tillage, the hoe for weeding, the rake for loosening the soil, and the sickle for harvesting crops. Depending on their size, Han plows were driven by either one ox or two oxen. Oxen were also used to pull the three-legged iron seed drill (invented in Han China by the 2nd century BCE), which enabled farmers to plant seeds in precise rows instead of casting them out by hand. While artwork of the Wei (220–266 CE) and Jin (266–420) periods show use of the harrow for breaking up chunks of soil after plowing, it perhaps first appeared in China during the Eastern Han (25–220 CE). Irrigation works for agriculture included the use of water wells, artificial ponds and embankments, dams, canals, and sluice gates.

Alternating fields

During Emperor Wu's (r. 141–87 BCE) reign, the Grain Intendant Zhao Guo (趙過) invented the alternating fields system (daitianfa 代田法). While weeding in the summer, the loose soil of the ridges (long 壟) on either side of the furrows would gradually fall into the furrows, covering the sprouting crops and protecting them from wind and drought. Since the position of the furrows and ridges were reversed by the next year, this process was called the alternating fields system.

This system allowed crops to grow in straight lines from sowing to harvest, conserved moisture in the soil, and provided a stable annual yield for harvested crops. Zhao Guo first experimented with this system right outside the capital Chang'an, and once it proved successful, he sent out instructions for it to every commandery administrator, who were then responsible for disseminating these to the heads of every county, district, and hamlet in their commanderies. Sadao Nishijima speculates that the Imperial Counselor Sang Hongyang (d. 80 BCE) perhaps had a role in promoting this new system.

Rich families who owned oxen and large heavy moldboard iron plows greatly benefited from this new system. However, poorer farmers who did not own oxen resorted to using teams of men to move a single plow, which was exhausting work.

Pit fields
During the reign of Emperor Cheng of Han (r. 33–37 BCE), Fan Shengzhi wrote a manual (i.e. the Fan Shengzhi shu) which described the pit field system (aotian 凹田). Twenty seeds were sowed into each pit, which allegedly produced 0.6 L (20 oz) of harvested grain per pit, or roughly 2,000 L (67,630 oz) per mou. This system did not require oxen-driven plows or the most fertile land, since it could be employed even on sloping terrains where supplying water was difficult for other methods of farming. Although this farming method was favored by the poor, it did require intensive labor, thus only large families could maintain such a system.

Rice paddies

Han farmers in the Yangzi River region of southern China often maintained paddy fields for growing rice. Every year, they would burn the weeds in the paddy field, drench it in water, sow rice by hand, and around harvest time cut the surviving weeds and drown them a second time. In this system, the field lays fallow for much of the year and thus did not remain very fertile. However, Han rice farmers to the north around the Huai River practiced the more advanced system of transplantation. In this system, individual plants were given intensive care (perhaps in the same location as the paddy field), their offshoots separated so that more water could be conserved, and the field could be heavily fertilized since winter crops were grown while the rice seedlings were situated nearby in a plant nursery.

Mechanical and hydraulic engineering

Literary sources and archaeological evidence

Evidence of Han-era mechanical engineering comes largely from the choice observational writings of sometimes disinterested Confucian scholars. Professional artisan-engineers (jiang 匠) did not leave behind detailed records of their work. Han scholars, who often had little or no expertise in mechanical engineering, sometimes provided insufficient information on the various technologies they described.

Nevertheless, some Han literary sources provide crucial information. As written by Yang Xiong in 15 BCE, the belt drive was first used for a quilling device which wound silk fibers onto the bobbins of weaver shuttles. The invention of the belt drive was a crucial first step in the development of later technologies during the Song dynasty, such as the chain drive and spinning wheel.

The inventions of the artisan and mechanical engineer Ding Huan (丁緩) are mentioned in the Miscellaneous Notes on the Western Capital. The official and poet Sima Xiangru (179–117 BCE) once hinted in his writings that the Chinese used a censer in the form of a gimbal, a pivot support made of concentric rings which allow the central gimbal to rotate on an axis while remaining vertically positioned. However, the first explicit mention of the gimbal used as an incense burner occurred around 180 CE when the artisan Ding Huan created his 'Perfume Burner for use among Cushions' which allowed burning incense placed within the central gimbal to remain constantly level even when moved. Ding had other inventions as well. He also invented a lamp which he called the 'nine-storied hill-censer', since it was shaped as a hillside. When the cylindrical lamp was lit, the convection of rising hot air currents caused vanes placed on the top to spin, which in turn rotated painted paper figures of birds and other animals around the lamp.

Zhang Heng wrote in the 2nd century CE that people could be entertained by theatrical plays of artificial fish and dragons. Later, the inventor Ma Jun (fl. 220–265) invented a theater of moving mechanical puppets powered by the rotation of a hidden waterwheel.

From literary sources it is known that the collapsible umbrella was invented during Wang Mang's reign, although the simple parasol existed beforehand. This employed sliding levers and bendable joints that could be protracted and retracted.

Modern archaeology has led to the discovery of Han artwork portraying inventions which were otherwise absent in Han literary sources. This includes the crank handle. Han pottery tomb models of farmyards and gristmills possess the first known depictions of crank handles, which were used to operate the fans of winnowing machines. The machine was used to separate chaff from grain, but the Chinese of later dynasties also employed the crank handle for silk-reeling, hemp-spinning, flour-sifting, and drawing water from a well using the windlass. To measure distance traveled, the Han-era Chinese also created the odometer cart. This invention is depicted in Han artwork by the 2nd century CE, yet detailed written descriptions were not offered until the 3rd century. The wheels of this device rotated a set of gears which in turn forced mechanical figures to bang gongs and drums that alerted the travelers of the distance traveled (measured in li). From existing specimens found at archaeological sites, it is known that Han-era craftsmen made use of the sliding metal caliper to make minute measurements. Although Han-era calipers bear incised inscriptions of the exact day of the year they were manufactured, they are not mentioned in any Han literary sources.

Uses of the waterwheel and water clock
By the Han dynasty, the Chinese developed various uses for the waterwheel. An improvement of the simple lever-and-fulcrum tilt hammer device operated by one's foot, the hydraulic-powered trip hammer used for pounding, decorticating, and polishing grain was first mentioned in the Han dictionary Jijiupian of 40 BCE. It was also mentioned in the Regional Speech (Fangyan) dictionary written by Yang Xiong (53 BCE – 18 CE) in 15 BCE, the philosophical Xinlun 新論 written by Huan Tan (43 BCE – 28 CE) in 20 CE, the poetry of Ma Rong (79–166 CE), and the writings of Kong Rong (153–208 CE).

In his Balanced Discourse (Lunheng), the philosopher Wang Chong (27–100 CE) was the first in China to describe the square-pallet chain pump used to lift water (and other substances). Although some models were operated manually by foot pedals, some chain pumps were powered by a horizontal waterwheel which rotated large toothed gears and a horizontal axis beam. Their primary use was for lifting water into irrigation ditches, but chain pumps were also used in public works programs, such as when Zhang Rang (d. 189) had an engineer build several of them to lift water into pipes that provided the capital Luoyang and its palaces with clean water.

While acting as administrator of Nanyang in 31 CE, Du Shi (d. 38) invented a water-powered reciprocator which worked the bellows of the blast furnace and cupola furnace in smelting iron; before this invention, intensive manual labor was required to work the bellows.

Although the astronomical armillary sphere (representing the celestial sphere) had existed in China since the 1st century BCE, the mathematician and court astronomer Zhang Heng (78–139 CE) provided it with motive power by using the constant pressure head of an inflow water clock to rotate a waterwheel that acted on a set of gears. Zhang Heng was also the first to address the problem of the falling pressure head in the inflow water clock (which gradually slowed the timekeeping) by setting up an additional tank between the reservoir and inflow vessel.

Seismometer

The Han court was responsible for the major efforts of disaster relief when natural disasters such as earthquakes devastated the lives of commoners. To better prepare for calamities, Zhang Heng invented a seismometer in 132 CE, which provided instant alert to authorities in the capital Luoyang that an earthquake had occurred in a location indicated by a specific cardinal or ordinal direction. Zhang called his device the 'instrument for measuring the seasonal winds and the movements of the Earth' (Houfeng didong yi 候风地动仪), so-named because he and others thought that earthquakes were most likely caused by the enormous compression of trapped air.

The trigger mechanism was an inverted pendulum (which the Book of the Later Han calls the "central column") that, if disturbed by the ground tremors of earthquakes located near or far away, would swing and strike one of eight mobile arms (representing the eight directions), each with a crank and catch mechanism. The crank and a right angle lever would raise one of eight metal dragon heads located on the exterior, dislodging a metal ball from its mouth that dropped into the mouth of one of eight metal toads below arranged like the points on a compass rose, thus indicating the direction of the earthquake. The Book of the Later Han states that when the ball fell into any one of eight toad mouths, it produced a loud noise which gained the attention of those observing the device. While Wang Zhenduo (王振铎) accepted the idea that Zhang's seismometer had cranks and levers which were disturbed by the inverted pendulum, his contemporary Akitsune Imamura (1870–1948) argued that the inverted pendulum could have had a pin at the top which, upon moving by force of the ground vibrations, would enter one of eight slots and expel the ball by pushing a slider. Since the Book of the Later Han states that the other seven dragon heads would not subsequently release the balls lodged up into their jaws after the first one had dropped, Imamura asserted that the pin of the pendulum would have been locked into the slot it had entered and thus immobilized the instrument until it was reset.

Mathematics and astronomy

Mathematical treatises

One of the earliest surviving mathematical treatises of ancient China is the Book on Numbers and Computation (Suan shu shu), part of the Zhangjiashan Han bamboo texts dated 202 to 186 BCE and found in Jiangling County, Hubei. Another mathematical text compiled during the Han was The Arithmetical Classic of the Gnomon and the Circular Paths of Heaven (Zhoubi Suanjing), dated no earlier than the 1st century BCE (from perhaps multiple authors) and contained materials similar to those described by Yang Xiong in 15 BCE, yet the zhoubi school of mathematics was not explicitly mentioned until Cai Yong's (132–192 CE) commentary of 180. A preface was added to the text by Zhao Shuang 趙爽 in the 3rd century. There was also the Nine Chapters on the Mathematical Art (Jiuzhang Suanshu); its full title was found on two bronze standard measurers dated 179 CE (with speculation that its material existed in earlier books under different titles) and was provided with detailed commentary by Liu Hui (fl. 3rd century) in 263. It is worth noting in this context that many of the documents excavated from Qin and Han sites contain evidence of the practical mathematics used by administrators for inventories and taxes, as well as for calculating labor needed for public works projects, just as described in the mathematical treatises.

Innovations in the treatises
The Suan shu shu presents basic mathematics problems and solutions. It was most likely a handbook for day-to-day business transactions or affairs of government administration. It contains problems and solutions for field measurements of area, proportional exchange rates for agricultural millet and rice, distribution by proportion, short width division, and excess and deficiency. Some of the problems found in the Suan shu shu appear in the later text Jiuzhang suanshu; in five cases, the titles are exact matches. However, unlike the Jiuzhang suanshu, the Suan shu shu does not deal with problems involving right-angle triangles, square roots, cube roots, and matrix methods, which demonstrates the significant advancements made in Chinese mathematics between the writings of these two texts.

The Zhoubi suanjing, written in dialogue form and with regularly presented problems, is concerned with the application of mathematics to astronomy. In one problem which sought to determine the height of the Sun from the Earth and the diameter of the Sun, Chen Zi (陳子) instructs Rong Fang (榮方) to wait until the shadow cast by the 8 chi tall gnomon is 6 chi (one chi during the Han was 33 cm), so that a 3-4-5 right-angle triangle can be constructed where the base is 60,000 li (one li during the Han was the equivalent of 415 m or 1362 ft), the hypotenuse leading towards the sun is 100,000 li, and the height of the sun is 80,000 li. Like the Jiuzhang suanshu, the Zhoubi suanjing also gives mathematical proof for the "Gougu Theorem" (勾股定理; i.e. where c is the length of the hypotenuse and a and b are the lengths of the other two sides, respectively, a2 + b2 = c2), which is known as the Pythagorean theorem in the West after the Greek mathematician Pythagoras (fl. 6th century BCE).

The Jiuzhang suanshu was perhaps the most groundbreaking of the three surviving Han treatises. It is the first known book to feature negative numbers, along with the Bakhshali manuscript (200? – 600? CE) of India and the book of the Greek mathematician Diophantus (fl. 3rd century) written in about 275 CE. Negative numbers appeared as black counting rods, while positive numbers appeared as red counting rods. Although the decimal system existed in China since the Shang dynasty (c. 1600 – c. 1050 BCE), the earliest evidence of a decimal fraction (i.e. the denominator is a power of ten) is an inscription on a standard volume-measuring vessel dated 5 CE and used by the mathematician and astronomer Liu Xin (46 BCE – 23 CE). Yet the first book to feature decimal fractions was the Jiuzhang suanshu, as a means to solve equations and represent measurements. Gaussian elimination, an algorithm used to solve linear equations, was known as the Array Rule in the Jiuzhang suanshu. While the book used continued fractions to find the roots of equations, Liu Hui built on this idea in the 3rd century when he increased the decimals to find the cube root of 1,860,867 (yielding the answer 123), the same method used in the Horner scheme named after William George Horner (1786–1837).

Approximations of pi
For centuries, the Chinese had simply approximated the value of pi as 3, until Liu Xin approximated it at 3.154 sometime between 1–5 CE, although the method he used to reach this value is unknown to historians. Standard measuring vessels dating to the reign of Wang Mang (9–23 CE) also showed approximations for pi at 3.1590, 3.1497, and 3.167. Zhang Heng is the next known Han mathematician to have made an approximation for pi. Han mathematicians understood that the area of a square versus the area of its inscribed circle had an approximate ratio of 4:3, and also understood that the volume of a cube and the volume of its inscribed sphere would be 42:32. With D as diameter and V as volume, D3:V = 16:9 or V=9⁄16D3, a formula Zhang found fault with since he realized the value for diameter was inaccurate, the discrepancy being the value taken for the ratio. To fix this, Zhang added 1⁄16D3 to the formula, thus V = 9⁄16D3 + 1⁄16D3 = 5⁄8D3. Since he found the ratio of the volume of the cube to the inscribed sphere at 8:5, the ratio of the area of a square to the inscribed circle is :. With this formula, Zhang was able to approximate pi as the square root of 10, or 3.162. After the Han, Liu Hui approximated pi as 3.14159, while the mathematician Zu Chongzhi (429–500) approximated pi at 3.141592 (or 355⁄113), the most accurate approximation the ancient Chinese would achieve.

Musical tuning and theory
Mathematics were also used in musical tuning and music theory. The 2nd-century-BCE Huainanzi, compiled by eight scholars under the patronage of King Liu An (179–122 BCE), outlined the use of twelve tones on a musical scale. Jing Fang (78–37 BCE), a mathematician and music theorist, expanded these to create a scale of 60 tones. While doing so, Jing Fang realized that 53 just fifths is approximate to 31 octaves. By calculating the difference at 177147⁄176776, Jing reached the same value of 53 equal temperament duly discovered by the German mathematician Nicholas Mercator (1620–1687) (i.e. 353/284, known as Mercator's comma). Later, the prince Zhu Zaiyu (1536–1611) in Ming China and Simon Stevin (1548–1620) of the Flemish Region in Europe would simultaneously (but separately) discover the mathematical formula for equal temperament.

Astronomical observations

The ancient Chinese made careful observations of heavenly bodies and phenomena since observations of the cosmos were used for astrology and prognostication. The astronomer Gan De (fl. 4th century BCE) from the State of Qi was the first in history to acknowledge sunspots as genuine solar phenomena (and not obstructing natural satellites as thought in the West after Einhard's observation in 807), while the first precisely dated sunspot observation in China occurred on May 10, 28 BCE, during the reign of Emperor Cheng of Han (r. 33–7 BCE). Among the Mawangdui Silk Texts dated no later than 168 BCE (when they were sealed in a tomb at Mawangdui Han tombs site, Changsha, Hunan province), the Miscellaneous Readings of Cosmic Patterns and Pneuma Images (Tianwen qixiang zazhan 天文氣象雜占) manuscript illustrates in writings and ink drawings roughly 300 different climatic and astronomical features, including clouds, mirages, rainbows, stars, constellations, and comets. Another silk text from the same site reports the times and locations of the rising and setting of planets in the night sky from the years 246–177 BCE.

The Han-era Chinese noted the passage of the same comet seen in Persia for the birth of Mithridates II of Parthia in 135 BCE, the same comet the Romans observed close to the assassination of Julius Caesar in 44 BCE, Halley's comet in 12 BCE, the same comet noted by Roman historian Cassius Dio (c. 155 – c. 229 CE) for 13 CE, and (what is now known to have been) a supernova in AD 185. For various comets discussed in the Han-era history books Records of the Grand Historian and Book of Han, details are given for their position in the sky and direction they were moving, the length of time they were visible, their color, and their size.

The Han-era Chinese also made star catalogues, such as historian Sima Qian's (145–86 BCE) A Monograph on Celestial Officials (Tianguanshu 天官書) and Zhang Heng's 2nd-century-CE star catalogue which featured roughly 2,500 stars and 124 constellations. To create a three-dimensional representation of such observations, Astronomer Geng Shouchang (耿壽昌) provided his armillary sphere with an equatorial ring in 52 BCE. By 84 CE, the elliptical ring was added to the armillary sphere, while Zhang Heng's model of 125 added the celestial horizon ring and meridian ring.

Han calendars

The Han Chinese used astronomical studies mainly to construct and revise their calendar. In contrast to the Julian calendar (46 BCE) and Gregorian calendar (1582) of the West (but like the Hellenic calendars of Classical Greece), the Chinese calendar is a lunisolar calendar, meaning that it uses the precise movements of the Sun and Moon as time-markers throughout the year. During the spring and autumn periods of the 5th century BCE, the Chinese established the Sifen calendar (古四分历), which measured the tropical year at 3651⁄4 days (like the Julian calendar of Rome). Emperor Wu replaced this with the new Taichu calendar (太初历) in 104 BCE, which measured the tropical year at 365385⁄1539 days and the lunar month at 2943⁄81 days. Since the Taichu calendar had become inaccurate over two centuries, Emperor Zhang of Han (r. 75–88 CE) halted its use and revived use of the Sifen calendar. Later, astronomer Guo Shoujing (1233–1316) would set the tropical year at 365.2425 days for his Shoushi calendar (授時曆), the same value used in the Gregorian calendar. Besides the use of the calendar for regulating agricultural practices throughout the seasons, it was also used to mark important dates in the Sexagenary cycle—constructed by celestial stems (gan 干) and Earthly Branches (zhi 支), each of the latter associated with an animal of the Chinese zodiac.

Astronomical theory
Zhao Shaung's 3rd-century commentary in the Zhoubi suanjing describes two astronomical theories: in one, the heavens are shaped as a hemi-spherical dome extending over the Earth, while the other compares the Earth to the central yolk of an egg, where the heavens are shaped as a celestial sphere around the earth. The latter astronomical theory was mentioned by Yang Xiong in his Model Sayings (Fayan 法言) and expounded on by Zhang Heng in his Spiritual Constitution of the Universe (Lingxian 靈憲) of 120 CE. Thus, the Han-era Chinese believed in a geocentric model for the immediate Solar System and greater universe, as opposed to a heliocentric model.

The Han-era Chinese discussed the illumination and shapes of heavenly bodies: were they flat and circular, or were they rounded and spherical? Jing Fang wrote in the 1st century BCE that Han astronomers believed the Sun, Moon, and planets were spherical like balls or crossbow bullets. He also wrote that the Moon and planets produce no light of their own, are viewable to people on Earth only because they are illuminated by the Sun, and those parts not illuminated by the Sun would be dark on the other side. For this, Jing compared the Moon to a mirror illuminating light. In the 2nd century CE, Zhang Heng drew a similar comparison to Jing's by stating that the Sun is like fire and the Moon and planets are like water, since fire produces light and water reflects it. He also repeated Jing's comment that the side of the Moon not illuminated by the Sun was left in darkness. However, Zhang noted that sunlight did not always reach the Moon since the Earth obstructs the rays during a lunar eclipse. He also noted that a solar eclipse occurred when the Moon and Sun crossed paths to block sunlight from reaching earth.

In his Balanced Discourse (Lunheng), Wang Chong (27–100 CE) wrote that some Han thinkers believed that rain fell from the Heavens (i.e. where the stars were located). Wang argued that, although rain fell from above, this common theory was false. He agreed with another theory that stated clouds were formed by the evaporation of water on Earth, and that since clouds disperse rain, clouds and rain are in fact one and the same; in essence, he accurately described the water cycle.

Structural engineering and public works

Materials and construction
Timber was the chief building material in Han architecture. It was used for grand palace halls, multi-story towers, multi-story residential halls, and humble abodes. However, due to wood's rapid decay over time and susceptibility to fire, the oldest wooden buildings found in China (i.e. several temple halls of Mount Wutai) date no earlier than the Tang dynasty (618–907). Architectural historian Robert L. Thorp describes the scarcity of Han-era archaeological remains, as well as the often unreliable Han-era literary and artistic sources used by historians for clues about non-existent Han architecture. What remains of Han-dynasty architecture are ruins of brick and rammed earth walls (including aboveground city walls and underground tomb walls), rammed earth platforms for terraced altars and halls, funerary stone or brick pillar-gates, and scattered ceramic roof tiles that once adorned timber halls. Sections of the Han-era rammed earth Great Wall still exist in Gansu province, along with the Han frontier ruins of thirty beacon towers and two fortified castles with crenellations. Han walls of frontier towns and forts in Inner Mongolia were typically constructed with stamped clay bricks instead of rammed earth.

Thatched or tiled roofs were supported by wooden pillars, since the addition of brick, rammed earth, or mud walls of these halls did not actually support the roof. Stone and plaster were also used for domestic architecture. Tiled eaves projecting outward were built to distance falling rainwater from the walls; they were supported by dougong brackets that were sometimes elaborately decorated. Molded designs usually decorated the ends of roof tiles, as seen in artistic models of buildings and in surviving tile pieces.

Courtyard homes
Valuable clues about Han architecture can be found in Han artwork of ceramic models, paintings, and carved or stamped bricks discovered in tombs and other sites. The layout of Han tombs were also built like underground houses, comparable to the scenes of courtyard houses found on tomb bricks and in three-dimensional models. Han homes had a courtyard area (and some had multiple courtyards) with halls that were slightly elevated above it and connected by stairways. Multi-story buildings included the main colonnaded residence halls built around the courtyards as well as watchtowers. The halls were built with intersecting crossbeams and rafters that were usually carved with decorations; stairways and walls were usually plastered over to produce a smooth surface and then painted.

Chang'an and Luoyang, the Han capitals
Overall the total length of walls equalled , and formed a roughly square layout (although the southern and northern walls had sections which zigzagged due to topographical concerns: rough terrain existed along the southern wall and the course of the Wei River obstructed the straight path of the northern wall). Chang'an had twelve gatehouses leading into the city, three for each side of the wall, and acted as terminus points for the main avenues. The drainage system included many drainholes that were dug under these gates and lined with bricks that form arches, where ceramic water pipes have been found that once connected to the ditches built alongside the major streets. Only some wall sections and platform foundations of the city's once lavish imperial palaces remain. Likewise, the stone foundations of the armory were also discovered, but its wooden architecture had long since disappeared.

The overall walled enclosure formed a rectangular shape, yet with some disruptive curves due to topographical obstructions. Like Chang'an, Luoyang had twelve gatehouses, three for each side of the wall, while each gatehouse had three gateway entrances which led to major avenues within the city. The rammed earth foundational platforms of religious altars and terraces still stand today outside of the walled perimeter of Luoyang, dedicated to the worship of deities and where state sacrifices were conducted. They were approached by long ramps and once had timber halls built on top with verandas on the lower levels.

Underground tombs

By the 1980s, over ten thousand brick-and-stone underground Han tombs had been discovered throughout China. Earlier Chinese tombs dating to the Warring States were often vertically dug pits lined with wooden walls. In digging the tomb sites, Han workers would first build vertical pits and then dig laterally, hence the name "horizontal pits" for Han tombs; this method was also used for tomb sites dug into the sides of mountains. The walls of most Western Han tombs were built of large hollow bricks while the smaller, non-hollow brick type that dominated Eastern Han tomb architecture (with some made out of stone) appeared in the late Western Han. The smaller brick type was better-suited for Han tomb archways at entrances, vaulted chambers, and domed roofs. Underground vaults and domes did not require buttress supports since they were held in place by earthen pits. The use of brick vaults and domes in aboveground Han structures is unknown.

The layout of tombs dug into the sides of mountains typically had a front chamber, side chambers, and a rear chambers designed to imitate a complex of aboveground halls. The tomb of King Liu Sheng (d. 113 BCE) in Hebei province not only had a front hall with window drapes and grave goods, carriages and horses in the southern separate side chamber, and storage goods in the northern side chamber, but also the remains of real timber houses with tiled roofs erected within (along with a house made of stone slabs and two stone doors in the rear chamber). Doors made completely out of stone were found in many Han tombs as well as tombs in later dynasties.

A total of twenty-nine monumental brick or stone-carved pillar-gates (que) from the Han dynasty have survived and can be found in the aboveground areas around Han tomb and shrine sites. They often formed part of outer walls, usually flanking an entry but sometimes at the corners of walled enclosures. Although they lack wooden and ceramic components, they feature imitation roof tiles, eaves, porches, and balustrades.

Boreholes and mining shafts
On Han tomb brick reliefs of Sichuan province, scenes of borehole drilling for mining projects are shown. They show towering derricks lifting liquid brine through bamboo pipes to the surface so that the brine could be distilled in evaporation pans over the heat of furnaces and produce salt. The drill bit for digging boreholes was operated by a team of men jumping on and off a beam while the boring tool was rotated by a draft animal, usually oxen or water buffaloes. Han boreholes dug for collecting brine could reach hundreds of meters (feet) beneath the Earth's surface. Mining shafts dating to the Han dynasty have been found which reach depths of hundreds of meters (feet) beneath the earth, complete with spacious underground rooms structured by timber frames along with ladders and iron tools left behind.

Ceramic model buildings

There are Han-era literary references to tall towers found in the capital cities; they often served as watchtowers, astronomical observatories, and religious establishments meant to attract the favor of immortals. The court eunuchs Zhao Zhong and Zhang Rang discouraged the aloof Emperor Ling of Han (r. 168–189 CE) from ascending to the top floors of tall towers (claiming it would cause bad luck), in order to conceal from him the enormous palatial mansions the eunuchs built for themselves in Luoyang. It is not known for certain whether or not miniature ceramic models of residential towers and watchtowers found in Han-dynasty tombs are completely faithful representations of such timber towers, yet they reveal vital clues about lost timber architecture.

There are only a handful of existing ceramic models of multi-story towers from pre-Han and Western Han eras; the bulk of the hundreds of towers found so far were made during the Eastern Han period. Model towers could be fired as one piece in the kiln or assembled from several different ceramic pieces to create the whole. No one tower is a duplicate of the other, yet they share common features. They often had a walled courtyard at the bottom, a balcony with balustrades and windows for every floor, roof tiles capping and concealing the ceiling rafters, human figures peering out the windows or standing on the balconies, door knockers, and pets such as dogs in the bottom courtyard. Perhaps the most direct pieces of evidence to suggest that miniature ceramic tower models are faithful representations of real-life Han timber towers are tile patterns. Artistic patterns found on the circular tiles that cap the eave-ends on the miniature models are exact matches of patterns found on real-life Han roof tiles excavated at sites such as the royal palaces in Chang'an and Luoyang, and even the tiles of the original White Horse Temple.

Besides towers, other ceramic models from the Han reveal a variety of building types. This includes multi-story storehouses such as granaries, courtyard houses with multi-story halls, kiosks, walled gate towers, mills, manufactories and workshops, animal pens, outhouses, and water wells. Even models of single-story farmhouses show a great amount of detail, including tiled roofs, courtyards, steps leading to walkways, farmyards with troughs and basins, parapets, and privies. Models of granaries and storehouses had tiled rooftops, dougong brackets, windows, and stilt supports raising them above ground level. Han models of water wells sometimes feature tiny tiled roofs supported by beams that house the rope pulley used for lifting the bucket.

Roads, bridges, and canals

In order to facilitate commerce and communication as well as speed the process of tax collection and movement of military troops, the Han government sponsored the building of new roads, bridges, and canal waterways. These include repairs and renovation work on the Dujiangyan Irrigation System of Sichuan and Zhengguo Canal of Shaanxi, both of which were built by the previous State of Qin. Accepting the proposal of Ni Kuan, in 111 BCE Emperor Wu commissioned Er to lead the project of creating extensions to the Zhengguo Canal that could irrigate nearby terrain elevated above the main canal. The Han state also maintained a system of dikes to protect farmland from seasonal floods.

Roadways, wooden bridges, postal stations, and relay stations were occasionally repaired, while many new facilities such as these were established. As written by Han authors, roads built during the Han were tamped down with metal rammers, yet there is uncertainty over the materials used; Joseph Needham speculates that they were rubble and gravel. The widths of roads ranged from narrow footpaths where only a single horse or oxen could pass at once to large highways that could accommodate the simultaneous passage of nine horse-drawn chariots abreast. Fortified Han roadways were built as far west as Shanshan (Loulan) near the Lop Desert, while Han forces utilized routes that traversed north of the Taklamakan Desert towards Kashgar. A vast network of roads, fortified passes, and wooden bridges built over rushing torrents in steep gorges of the Qin Mountains was consolidated during the Han, known as the gallery roads. During the reign of Emperor Wu, roads were built to connect newly conquered territories in what is now Yunnan in the far southwest as well as the Korean Peninsula in the far northeast.

One of the most common bridge-types built during the Han was the wooden-trestle beam bridge, described by literary sources and seen in reliefs carved on tomb bricks. Evidence for arch bridges is elusive: one outside of Chengdu's south gate is claimed to date to the Han period, while that built by Ma Xian (馬賢) (fl. 135 CE) was certainly a beam bridge. In artwork, a relief sculpture from a Han tomb in Sichuan province shows an arch bridge with a gradual curve, suggesting that it is segmental, although the use of such bridges are not entirely confirmed. Although there are rare references to simple suspension bridges in Han sources, these are only mentioned in connection with travels to foreign countries in the Himalaya, Hindukush and Afghanistan, demonstrating the antiquity of the invention there. Floating pontoon bridges made of boats secured by iron chains were built during the Han (some even spanning the Yellow River and Yangzi River) and were most often employed for military purposes since they could be easily assembled and then disassembled.

Medicine

Much of the beliefs held by Han-era physicians are known to modern historians through such texts as the Yellow Emperor's Inner Canon (Huangdi neijing) medical corpus, which was compiled from the 3rd to 2nd century BCE and was mentioned in the Book of Later Han. It is clear from this text and others that their metaphysical beliefs in the five phases and yin and yang dictated their medical decisions and assumptions. The Han-era Chinese believed that each organ in the body was associated with one of the five phases (metal 金, wood 木, water 水, fire 火, earth 土) and had two circulatory qi channels (任督二脉). If these channels were disrupted, Han medical texts suggest that one should consume an edible material associated with one of these phases that would counteract the organ's prescribed phase and thus restore one's health. For example, the Chinese believed that when the heart—associated with the fire phase—caused one to become sluggish, then one should eat sour food because it was associated with the wood phase (which promoted fire). The Han Chinese also believed that by using pulse diagnosis, a physician could determine which organ of the body emitted "vital energy" (qi) and what qualities the latter had, in order to figure out the exact disorder the patient was suffering. Despite the influence of metaphysical theory on medicine, Han texts also give practical advice, such as the proper way to perform clinical lancing to remove an abscess. The Huangdi neijing noted the symptoms and reactions of people with various diseases of the liver, heart, spleen, lung, or kidneys in a 24-hour period, which was a recognition of circadian rhythm, although explained in terms of the five phases.

In his Essential Medical Treasures of the Golden Chamber (Jinkui yaolue), Zhang Zhongjing (c. 150 – c. 219 CE) was the first to suggest a regulated diet rich in certain vitamins could prevent different types of disease, an idea which led Hu Sihui (fl. 1314–1330) to prescribe a diet rich in Vitamin B1 as a treatment for beriberi. Zhang's major work was the Treatise on Cold Injury and Miscellaneous Disorders (Shanghan zabing lun). His contemporary and alleged associate Hua Tuo (d. 208 CE) was a physician who had studied the Huangdi neijing and became knowledgeable in Chinese herbology. Hua Tuo used anesthesia on patients during surgery and created an ointment that was meant to fully heal surgery wounds within a month. In one diagnosis of an ill woman, he deciphered that she bore a dead fetus within her womb which he then removed, curing her of her ailments.

Historical sources say that Hua Tuo rarely practiced moxibustion and acupuncture. The first mentioning of acupuncture in Chinese literature appeared in the Huangdi neijing. Acupuncture needles made of gold were found in the tomb of the Han King Liu Sheng (d. 113 BCE). Some stone-carved depictions of acupuncture date to the Eastern Han Era (25–220 CE). Hua Tuo also wrote about the allegedly life-prolonging exercises of calisthenics. In the 2nd-century-BCE medical texts excavated from the Mawangdui, illustrated diagrams of calisthenic positions are accompanied by descriptive titles and captions. Vivienne Lo writes that the modern physical exercises of taijiquan and qigong are derived from Han-era calisthenics.

Cartography

Map-making in China preceded the Han dynasty. Since two 4th-century-BCE silk maps from the State of Qin (found in Gansu, displaying the region about the Jialing River) show the measured distance between timber-gathering sites, Mei-ling Hsu argues that these are to be considered the first known economic maps (as they predate the maps of the Roman geographer Strabo, c. 64 BCE – 24 CE). Maps from the Han period have also been uncovered by modern archaeologists, such as those found with 2nd-century-BCE silk texts at Mawangdui. In contrast to the Qin maps, the Han maps found at Mawangdui employ a more diverse use of map symbols, cover a larger terrain, and display information on local populations and even pinpoint locations of military camps. One of the maps discovered at Mawangdui shows positions of Han military garrisons which were to attack Nanyue in 181 BCE.

In Chinese literature, the oldest reference to a map comes from the year 227 BCE, when the assassin Jing Ke was to present a map to Ying Zheng 嬴政, King of Qin (ruling later as Qin Shi Huang, r. 221–210 BCE) on behalf of Crown Prince Dan of Yan. Instead of presenting the map, he pulled out a dagger from his scroll, yet was unable to kill Ying Zheng. The Rites of Zhou (Zhouli), compiled during the Han and commented by Liu Xin in the 1st century CE, mentioned the use of maps for governmental provinces and districts, principalities, frontier boundaries, and locations of ores and minerals for mining facilities. The first Chinese gazetteer was written in 52 CE and included information on territorial divisions, the founding of cities, and local products and customs. Pei Xiu (224–271 CE) was the first to describe in detail the use of a graduated scale and geometrically plotted reference grid. However, historians Howard Nelson, Robert Temple, and Rafe de Crespigny argue that there is enough literary evidence that Zhang Heng's now lost work of 116 CE established the geometric reference grid in Chinese cartography (including a line from the Book of Later Han: "[Zhang Heng] cast a network of coordinates about heaven and earth, and reckoned on the basis of it"). Although there is speculation fueled by the report in Sima's Records of the Grand Historian that a gigantic raised-relief map representing the Qin Empire is located within the tomb of Qin Shi Huang, it is known that small raised-relief maps were created during the Han dynasty, such as one made out of rice by the military officer Ma Yuan (14 BCE – 49 CE).

Nautics and vehicles

In 1975, an ancient shipyard discovered in Guangzhou is now dated to the late 3rd century BCE, made during either the Qin dynasty (221–206 BCE) or early Western Han dynasty. Another Han shipyard in what is now Anhui province had a government-operated maritime workshop where battle ships were assembled. The widespread use of iron tools during the Han dynasty was essential for crafting such vessels.

The southward expansion of the Han dynasty led to new trade routes and diplomatic contact with foreign kingdoms. In 111 BCE, Emperor Wu conquered the Kingdom of Nanyue in what is now modern northern Vietnam and Guangdong, Guangxi, Yunnan; thereafter he opened up maritime trade to both Southeast Asia and the Indian Ocean, as foreign merchants brought lapis lazuli, pearls, jade, and glasswares to the Han Empire from this southern sea route. When a group of travelers from the Roman Empire (allegedly diplomats of Marcus Aurelius but most likely Roman merchants) came to the Han court in 166 CE, they allegedly came from this southern trade route. By at least the 1st century CE—as proven by Eastern Han ceramic miniature models of ships found in various tombs—the Chinese would have been able to brave distant waters with the new steering invention of the stern-mounted rudder. This came to replace the less efficient steering oar. While ancient China was home to various ship designs, including the layered and fortified tower ship meant for calm waters of lakes and river, the junk design (jun 船) created by the 1st century was China's first seaworthy sailing ship. The typical junk has a square-ended bow and stern, a flat-bottomed hull or carvel-shaped hull with no keel or sternpost, and solid transverse bulkheads in the place of structural ribs found in Western seacrafts. Since the Chinese junk lacked a sternpost, the rudder was attached to the back of the ship by use of either socket-and-jaw or block and tackle (which differed from the later European pintle and gudgeon design of the 12th century). As written by a 3rd-century author, junks had for-and-aft rigs and lug sails.

Although horse and ox-drawn carts and spoke-wheeled chariots had existed in China long before the Han dynasty, it was not until the 1st century BCE that literary evidence pointed to the invention of the wheelbarrow, while painted murals on Han tomb walls of the 2nd century CE show the wheelbarrow in use for hauling goods. While the 'throat-and-girth' harness was still in use throughout much of the ancient world (placing an excessive amount of pressure on horses' necks), the Chinese were placing a wooden yoke across their horses' chests with traces to the chariot shaft by the 4th century BCE in the State of Chu (as seen on a Chu lacquerware). By Han times, the Chinese replaced this heavy yoke with a softer breast strap, as seen in Han stamped bricks and carved tomb reliefs. In the final stage of evolution, the modern horse collar was invented in China by the 5th century, during the Northern Wei period.

Weaponry and war machines

The pivot catapult, known as the traction trebuchet, had existed in China since the Warring States period (as evidenced by the Mozi). It was regularly used in sieges during the Han dynasty, by both besiegers and the besieged. The most common projectile weapon used during the Han dynasty was the small handheld, trigger-activated crossbow (and to a lesser extent, the repeating crossbow), first invented in China during the 6th or 5th century BCE. Although the nomadic Xiongnu were able to twist their waists slightly while horse-riding and shoot arrows at targets behind them, the official Chao Cuo (d. 154 BCE) deemed the Chinese crossbow superior to the Xiongnu bow.

The Han Chinese also employed chemical warfare. In quelling a peasant revolt near Guiyang in 178 CE, the imperial Han forces had horse-drawn chariots carrying bellows that were used to pump powdered lime (calcium oxide) at the rebels, who were dispersed. In this same instance, they also lit incendiary rags tied to the tails of horses, so that the frightened horses would rush through the enemy lines and disrupt their formations.

To deter pursuits of marching infantry or riding cavalry, the Han Chinese made caltrops (barbed iron balls with sharp spikes sticking out in all directions) that could be scattered on the ground and pierce the feet or hooves of those who were unaware of them.

See also
Chinese characters#Han dynasty
List of Chinese discoveries
List of Chinese inventions
List of inventions and discoveries of Neolithic China
History of science and technology in China
Science and technology

Notes

References

Adshead, Samuel Adrian Miles. (2000). China in World History. London: MacMillan Press Ltd. New York: St. Martin's Press. .
Arndt, Jörg, and Christoph Haenel. (2001). Pi Unleashed. Translated by Catriona and David Lischka. Berlin: Springer. .
Balchin, Jon. (2003). Science: 100 Scientists Who Changed the World. New York: Enchanted Lion Books. .
Barbieri-Low, Anthony J. (2007). Artisans in Early Imperial China. Seattle & London: University of Washington Press. .
Berggren, Lennart, Jonathan M. Borwein, and Peter B. Borwein. (2004). Pi: A Source Book. New York: Springer. .
Bielenstein, Hans. (1986). "Wang Mang, the Restoration of the Han Dynasty, and Later Han," in The Cambridge History of China: Volume I: the Ch'in and Han Empires, 221 B.C. – A.D. 220, 223–290. Edited by Denis Twitchett and Michael Loewe. Cambridge: Cambridge University Press. .
Block, Leo. (2003). To Harness the Wind: A Short History of the Development of Sails. Annapolis: Naval Institute Press. .
Bowman, John S. (2000). Columbia Chronologies of Asian History and Culture. New York: Columbia University Press. 
Buisseret, David. (1998). Envisioning the City: Six Studies in Urban Cartography. Chicago: University Of Chicago Press. .
Chang, Chun-shu. (2007). The Rise of the Chinese Empire: Volume II; Frontier, Immigration, & Empire in Han China, 130 B.C. – A.D. 157. Ann Arbor: University of Michigan Press. .
.
Chung, Chee Kit. (2005). "Longyamen is Singapore: The Final Proof?," in Admiral Zheng He & Southeast Asia. Singapore: Institute of Southeast Asian Studies. .
Cotterell, Maurice. (2004). The Terracotta Warriors: The Secret Codes of the Emperor's Army. Rochester: Bear and Company. .
Csikszentmihalyi, Mark. (2006). Readings in Han Chinese Thought. Indianapolis and Cambridge: Hackett Publishing Company, Inc. .
Cullen, Christoper. (2006). Astronomy and Mathematics in Ancient China: The Zhou Bi Suan Jing. Cambridge: Cambridge University Press. .
Day, Lance and Ian McNeil. (1996). Biographical Dictionary of the History of Technology. New York: Routledge. .
Dauben, Joseph W. (2007). "Chinese Mathematics" in The Mathematics of Egypt, Mesopotamia, China, India, and Islam: A Sourcebook, 187–384. Edited by Victor J. Katz. Princeton: Princeton University Press. .
de Crespigny, Rafe. (2007). A Biographical Dictionary of Later Han to the Three Kingdoms (23–220 AD). Leiden: Koninklijke Brill. .
Deng, Yingke. (2005). Ancient Chinese Inventions. Translated by Wang Pingxing. Beijing: China Intercontinental Press (五洲传播出版社). .
Dewar, Richard. (2002). Stoneware. Philadelphia: University of Pennsylvania Press. .
Di Cosmo, Nicola. (2002). Ancient China and its Enemies: The Rise of Nomadic Power in East Asian History. Cambridge: Cambridge University Press. .
Ebrey, Patricia. (1986). "The Economic and Social History of Later Han," in Cambridge History of China: Volume I: the Ch'in and Han Empires, 221 B.C. – A.D. 220, 608–648. Edited by Denis Twitchett and Michael Loewe. Cambridge: Cambridge University Press. .
Ebrey, Patricia. (1999). The Cambridge Illustrated History of China. Cambridge: Cambridge University Press. .
Fairbank, John K. and Merle Goldman. (1998). China: A New History, Enlarged Edition. Cambridge: Harvard University Press. .
Fong, Mary H. "Antecedents of Sui-Tang Burial Practices in Shaanxi," Artibus Asiae (Volume 51, Number 3/4, 1991): 147–198.
Greenberger, Robert. (2006). The Technology of Ancient China. New York: Rosen Publishing Group, Inc. .
Hansen, Valerie. (2000). The Open Empire: A History of China to 1600. New York & London: W.W. Norton & Company. .
Hargett, James M. "Song Dynasty Local Gazetteers and Their Place in The History of Difangzhi Writing," Harvard Journal of Asiatic Studies (Volume 56, Number 2, 1996): 405–442.
Hinsch, Bret. (2002). Women in Imperial China. Lanham: Rowman & Littlefield Publishers, Inc. .
Hiromi, Kinoshita. (2005). "Storehouse model," in Recarving China's Past: Art, Archaeology, and Architecture of the 'Wu Family Shrines, 290–291. Edited by Naomi Noble Richard. New Haven and London: Yale University Press and Princeton University Art Museum. .
.
Hsu, Elisabeth. (2001). "Pulse diagnostics in the Western Han: how mai and qi determine bing," in Innovations in Chinese Medicine, 51–92. Edited by Elisabeth Hsu. Cambridge, New York, Oakleigh, Madrid, and Cape Town: Cambridge University Press. .
Hsu, Mei-ling. "The Qin Maps: A Clue to Later Chinese Cartographic Development," Imago Mundi (Volume 45, 1993): 90–100.
Huang, Ray. (1988). China: A Macro History. Armonk & London: M.E. Sharpe Inc., an East Gate Book. .
Jin, Guantao, Fan Hongye, and Liu Qingfeng. (1996). "Historical Changes in the Structure of Science and Technology (Part Two, a Commentary)" in Chinese Studies in the History and Philosophy of Science and Technology, 165–184, edited by Fan Dainian and Robert S. Cohen, translated by Kathleen Dugan and Jiang Mingshan. Dordrecht: Kluwer Academic Publishers. .
Juliano, Annette L. (2005). "Model of a farm compound with human figure, sow and suckling pig, chickens, trough, and basin," in Recarving China's Past: Art, Archaeology, and Architecture of the 'Wu Family Shrines''', 286–289. Edited by Naomi Noble Richard. New Haven and London: Yale University Press and Princeton University Art Museum. .
Krebs, Robert E. (2003). The Basics of Earth Science. Westport: Greenwood Press of Greenwood Publishing Group, Inc. .
Lander, Brian. “State Management of River Dikes in Early China: New Sources on the Environmental History of the Central Yangzi Region.” T’oung Pao 100.4–5 (2014): 325–62.
Lin, Yun. "History of the Crossbow," in Chinese Classics & Culture, 1993, No. 4: 33–37.
Liu, Cary Y. (2005). "Green-glazed wellhead," in Recarving China's Past: Art, Archaeology, and Architecture of the 'Wu Family Shrines, 292–295. Edited by Naomi Noble Richard. New Haven and London: Yale University Press and Princeton University Art Museum. .
Liu, Guilin, Feng Lisheng, Jiang Airong, and Zheng Xiaohui. (2003). "The Development of E-Mathematics Resources at Tsinghua University Library (THUL)" in Electronic Information and Communication in Mathematics, 1–13. Edited by Bai Fengshan and Bern Wegner. Berlin, Heidelberg, and New York: Springer Verlag. .
Liu, Xujie (2002). "The Qin and Han Dynasties" in Chinese Architecture, 33–60. Edited by Nancy S. Steinhardt. New Haven: Yale University Press. .
Lloyd, Geoffrey Ernest Richard. (1996). Adversaries and Authorities: Investigations into Ancient Greek and Chinese Science. Cambridge: Cambridge University Press. .
Lo, Vivienne. (2001). "The influence of nurturing life culture on the development of Western Han acumoxa therapy," in Innovation in Chinese Medicine, 19–50. Edited by Elisabeth Hsu. Cambridge, New York, Oakleigh, Madrid, and Cape Town: Cambridge University Press. .
Loewe, Michael. (1968). Everyday Life in Early Imperial China during the Han Period 202 BC–AD 220. London: B.T. Batsford Ltd.; New York: G.P. Putnam's Sons. .
Loewe, Michael. (1994). Divination, Mythology and Monarchy in Han China. Cambridge, New York, and Melbourne: Cambridge University Press. .
Mao, Ying. "Introduction of Crossbow Mechanism," in Southeast Culture, 1998, No. 3: 109–117. .
McClain, Ernest G. and Ming Shui Hung. "Chinese Cyclic Tunings in Late Antiquity," Ethnomusicology, Vol. 23, No. 2 (May, 1979): 205–224.
Minford, John and Joseph S.M. Lau. (2002). Classical Chinese literature: an anthology of translations. New York: Columbia University Press. .
Morton, W. Scott and Charlton M. Lewis. (2005). China: Its History and Culture. New York: McGraw-Hill, Inc. .
Mott, Lawrence V. (1991). The Development of the Rudder: A Technological Tale. College Station: Texas A & M University Press. .
Needham, Joseph. (1972). Science and Civilisation in China: Volume 1, Introductory Orientations. London: Syndics of the Cambridge University Press. .
Needham, Joseph. (1986a). Science and Civilisation in China: Volume 3; Mathematics and the Sciences of the Heavens and the Earth. Taipei: Caves Books, Ltd. .
Needham, Joseph. (1986b). Science and Civilisation in China: Volume 4, Physics and Physical Technology; Part 1, Physics. Taipei: Caves Books Ltd. .
Needham, Joseph. (1986c). Science and Civilization in China: Volume 4, Physics and Physical Technology; Part 2, Mechanical Engineering. Taipei: Caves Books Ltd. .
Needham, Joseph. (1986d). Science and Civilisation in China: Volume 4, Physics and Physical Technology, Part 3, Civil Engineering and Nautics. Taipei: Caves Books Ltd. .
Needham, Joseph and Tsien Tsuen-Hsuin. (1986e). Science and Civilisation in China: Volume 5, Chemistry and Chemical Technology, Part 1, Paper and Printing. Taipei: Caves Books, Ltd. .
Needham, Joseph. (1986f). Science and Civilisation in China: Volume 5, Chemistry and Chemical Technology, Part 7, Military Technology; the Gunpowder Epic. Taipei: Caves Books, Ltd. .
Nishijima, Sadao. (1986). "The Economic and Social History of Former Han," in Cambridge History of China: Volume I: the Ch'in and Han Empires, 221 B.C. – A.D. 220, 545–607. Edited by Denis Twitchett and Michael Loewe. Cambridge: Cambridge University Press. .
Omura, Yoshiaki. (2003). Acupuncture Medicine: Its Historical and Clinical Background. Mineola: Dover Publications, Inc. .
Pigott, Vincent C. (1999). The Archaeometallurgy of the Asian Old World. Philadelphia: University of Pennsylvania Museum of Archaeology and Anthropology. .
Ronan, Colin A. (1994). The Shorter Science and Civilisation in China: 4 (an abridgement of Joseph Needham's work). Cambridge: Cambridge University Press. .
Shen, Kangshen, John N. Crossley and Anthony W.C. Lun. (1999). The Nine Chapters on the Mathematical Art: Companion and Commentary. Oxford: Oxford University Press. .
Steinhardt, Nancy Shatzman. "The Tang Architectural Icon and the Politics of Chinese Architectural History," The Art Bulletin (Volume 86, Number 2, 2004): 228–254.
Steinhardt, Nancy N. (2005). "Pleasure tower model," in Recarving China's Past: Art, Archaeology, and Architecture of the 'Wu Family Shrines', 275–281. Edited by Naomi Noble Richard. New Haven and London: Yale University Press and Princeton University Art Museum. .
Steinhardt, Nancy N. (2005). "Tower model," in Recarving China's Past: Art, Archaeology, and Architecture of the 'Wu Family Shrines', 283–285. Edited by Naomi Noble Richard. New Haven and London: Yale University Press and Princeton University Art Museum. .
Straffin, Philip D., Jr. "Liu Hui and the First Golden Age of Chinese Mathematics," Mathematics Magazine, Vol. 71, No. 3 (Jun., 1998): 163–181.
Sun, Xiaochun and Jacob Kistemaker. (1997). The Chinese Sky During the Han: Constellating Stars and Society. Leiden, New York, Köln: Koninklijke Brill. .
.
Temple, Robert. (1986). The Genius of China: 3,000 Years of Science, Discovery, and Invention. With a foreword by Joseph Needham. New York: Simon and Schuster, Inc. .
Thorp, Robert L. "Architectural Principles in Early Imperial China: Structural Problems and Their Solution," The Art Bulletin, Vol. 68, No. 3 (Sep., 1986): pp. 360–378.
Tom, K.S. (1989). Echoes from Old China: Life, Legends, and Lore of the Middle Kingdom. Honolulu: The Hawaii Chinese History Center of the University of Hawaii Press. .
Turnbull, Stephen R. (2001). Siege Weapons of the Far East. Oxford: Osprey Publishing Ltd. .
Turnbull, Stephen R. (2002). Fighting Ships of the Far East: China and Southeast Asia 202 BC–AD 1419. Oxford: Osprey Publishing, Ltd. .
Wagner, Donald B. (1993). Iron and Steel in Ancient China: Second Impression, With Corrections. Leiden: E.J. Brill. .
Wagner, Donald B. (2001). The State and the Iron Industry in Han China. Copenhagen: Nordic Institute of Asian Studies Publishing. .
Wang, Zhongshu. (1982). Han Civilization. Translated by K.C. Chang and Collaborators. New Haven and London: Yale University Press. .
 Watson, William. (2000). The Arts of China to AD 900. New Haven: Yale University Press. .
Woodman, Richard. (2002). The History of the Ship: The Comprehensive Story of Seafaring from the Earliest Times to the Present Day. London: Conway Maritime Press. .
Wright, David Curtis. (2001) The History of China. Westport: Greenwood Press. .
You, Zhanhong. "The Making Technique and Its Application in Military of Bow and Crossbow During Pre-Qin and Han Dynasty," in Journal of Tsinghua University'', Vol. 9, No. 3 (1994): 74–86. .

External links
 Hunan Provincial Museum (picture and description of the 2nd-century BCE Mawangdui garrison map)
 "Ceramic Models of Wells in the Han Dynasty (206 BC to AD 220), China", by Jiu J. Jiao, University of Alabama (pictures and description of Han architectural models)
 

Han dynasty
H
Ancient Chinese science